Walter Erich Schäfer (16 March 1901 in Hemmingen – 28 December 1981 in Stuttgart) was a German writer, dramaturge and from 1949 to 1972 Generalintendant (managing director) of the Staatstheater Stuttgart, responsible for opera, play and the Stuttgart Ballet.

Works 
Plays
 Echnathon, 1925 (Engelhorn Verlag)
 Richter Feuerbach, 1930 (Engelhorn Verlag)
 Der 18. Oktober, 1932 (Dieck Verlag)
 Schwarzmann und die Magd, 1933 (Engelhorn Verlag)
 Der Kaiser und der Löwe, 1934 (Dietzmann-Verlag)
 Das Feuer, 1934 (Dietzmann-Verlag)
 Die Reise nach Paris, 1936 (Dietzmann-Verlag)
 Die Kette, 1938 (Dietzmann-Verlag)
 Der Leutnant Vary, 1940 (Dietzmann-Verlag) / also as Der Leutnant Rougier
 Theres und die Hoheit, 1940 (Dietzmann-Verlag), filmed
 Die Verschwörung, 1949 (Dietzmann-Verlag)
 Hora Mortis, 1948 (Deutsche Verlagsanstalt)

Audio plays
 Malmgreen, 1925, in: „Sprich, damit ich dich sehe“, Frühe Hörspiele, 1962 (Paul List Verlag), tape (SDR/SWR)
 Die fünf Sekunden des Mahatma Gandhi, 1948 (Europ. Verlagsanstalt, Hörspielbuch 1), tape (SDR/SWR)
 Der Staatssekretär, ca. 1949, manuscript and tape (SDR/SWR)
 Konferenz in Christobal, ca. 1950, manuscript (SDR/SWR)
 Spiel der Gedanken, 1951 (Europ. Verlagsanstalt, Hörspielbuch)
 Die Himmelfahrt des Physikers M.N. 1958 (Europ. Verlagsanstalt, Hörspielbuch)
 Die Nacht im Hotel, 1966, manuscript (SDR/SWR)

Prose
 Die zwölf Stunden Gottes. Erzählung. Engelhorn Verlag, 1925.
 Letzte Wandlung. Novellen. Engelhorn Verlag, 1928.
 Das Regimentsfest. Erzählung. Engelhorn Verlag, 1933.
 Die Heimkehrer. Erzählungen. Staakmannverlag, 1944.
 Bühne eines Lebens. memoir. Deutsche Verlagsanstalt, 1975, .
 Kleine Wellen auf dem Fluß des Lebens. memoir. Deutsche Verlagsanstalt, 1976.
 Die Mutter des Schauspielers. novel. Deutsche Verlagsanstalt, 1981, .

Bildbände and monographies
 Günter Rennert, Regisseur in dieser Zeit. Schünemann Verlag, 1962
 Martha Mödl. Friedrichverlag, 1967
 Wieland Wagner. Persönlichkeit und Leistung. Rainer Wunderlich Verlag, 1970
 Die Stuttgarter Staatsoper 1950–1972. Neskeverlag, 1972, 
 John Cranko, Walter Erich Schäfer: Über den Tanz. Gespräche mit Walter Erich Schäfer. S. Fischer Verlag, 1974, 

Collection
 Schauspiele, Hörspiele (plays, audio plays) in two volumes2 Bände, Deutsche Verlagsanstalt 1967

Sources 
 Paul Eiermann: Geschichte der Landwirtschaftlichen Hochschule Hohenheim und des Hohenheimer S. C. Chronik der beiden Hohenheimer Corps "Germania" und "Suevia" zum 90. Stiftungsfest der "Germania". Stuttgart-Hohenheim 1961.
 Manfred G. Raupp: Fuchsenfibel des Corps Germania Hohenheim 2006.

Literature 
 John Cranko: Über den Tanz. Gespräche mit Walter Erich Schäfer. S. Fischer, Frankfurt am Main 1974
 
 Ernst Klee: Das Kulturlexikon zum Dritten Reich. Wer war was vor und nach 1945. Fischer, Frankfurt am Main 2007, p. 513
 Karl Ulrich Majer, Herbert von Strohmer (ed.): Walter Erich Schäfer zum 16. März 1971. Festschrift. Neske, Pfullingen 1971
 Florian Radvan: Eine deutsche Theaterkarriere. Der Dramatiker und Generalintendant Walter Erich Schäfer. Wissenschaftlicher Verlag Trier (WVT), Trier 1999
 Walter Erich Schäfer: Bühne eines Lebens. Erinnerungen. Deutsche Verlags-Anstalt, Stuttgart 1975.
 Alexander Werner: Carlos Kleiber. Eine Biografie. (Darin: Carlos Kleiber und die Württembergische Staatsoper 1964–1975), Schott Music, Mainz 2007
 Heinz Schwitzke: in "Frühe Hörspiele", Paul Listverlag, München 1962
 Michael Molnar, Karlheinz Fuchs: Ausstellungsreihe "Stuttgart im Dritten Reich: Die Machtergreifung", 1983.
 NDB Deutsche Biographie „Walter Erich Schäfer“.
 Alexander Werner: Carlos Kleiber. Eine Biografie. Schott Music

Documentation 
 Karl Ulrich Majer (book), Walter Rüdel (direction): Walter Erich Schäfer oder Die Theatertaten eines Gutsherrn aus Niederbayern, ZDF

External links 
 
 Walter Erich Schäfer, www.leo-bw.de

Opera managers
Knights Commander of the Order of Merit of the Federal Republic of Germany
Recipients of the Order of Merit of Baden-Württemberg
1901 births
1981 deaths
Writers from Stuttgart